Wayne John Athorne (7 September 1941 – 4 April 1992) was a national decathlon champion and Commonwealth Games competitor. He was also an Australian rules footballer with Hawthorn in the Victorian Football League (VFL).

Athorne played his early football at Xavier College and trialled at Melbourne before making his VFL debut for Hawthorn in a win over Carlton at Glenferrie Oval in the 1961 season. Hawthorn went on to win their first ever premiership that season. The following year he left football to pursue his love of athletics.

As a decathlete, Athorne finished second to John O'Neill in the 1965 Australian Open Track & Field Championships. He went one better in 1966 at Perry Lakes Stadium in Perth and won the decathlon, by just 30 points over South Australian John Hamann.

Having become the Australian champion, Athorne competed in the 1966 British Empire and Commonwealth Games, held in Jamaica. He finished fifth in the 120 yards hurdles heats in 15.34 seconds. In the decathlon he amassed 710 points before an injury to his right knee, sustained in the long jump, forced him to withdraw. The injury meant he was unable to take up a scholarship to University of California, Santa Barbara, which had been offered to him.

In 1975, Athorne confessed to taking performance-enhancing drugs for the three months leading up to the 1966 Commonwealth Games. He took Dianabol, an anabolic steroid, which was banned by the International Olympic Committee in 1967.

References

External links
 
 
 

1941 births
1992 deaths
Hawthorn Football Club players
Australian rules footballers from Victoria (Australia)
Australian decathletes
Commonwealth Games competitors for Australia
Athletes (track and field) at the 1966 British Empire and Commonwealth Games
Doping cases in athletics
Doping cases in Australian track and field
People educated at Xavier College
Athletes from Melbourne